Sterphus arethusa is a species of Hoverfly in the family Syrphidae.

Distribution
Suriname.

References

Eristalinae
Insects described in 1944
Diptera of South America
Taxa named by Frank Montgomery Hull